"No Time" is a song by Australian indie pop and ARIA award-winning group, Frente!. The song was released in February 1993 as the second single from their debut studio album Marvin the Album. The song peaked at number 50 on the ARIA Charts.

Track listing
 CD Single
 "No Time" - 3:21
 "Thinking Darling"	- 1:00
 "Blue" - 1:30
 "No Time"  (Something Fishy Mix)  - 3:19
 "Face Like a Spider" - 0:52

Weekly chart

External links

References

1993 singles
1992 songs
Frente! songs